Heliotropium arborescens, the garden heliotrope or just heliotrope, is a species of flowering plant in the borage family Boraginaceae, native to Bolivia, Colombia, and Peru. Common names also include cherry pie and common heliotrope. Note that the common name "garden heliotrope" may also refer to valerian, which is not closely related.

It is an economically damaging invasive species in Australia.

Cultivation
As a perennial, is hardy in zones 10 to 11, and requires wintering indoors in zones 9 or colder. It can also be grown as a half-hardy annual (grown from seed under glass and planted out after all danger of frost has passed) in those areas. Alternatively soft-wood cuttings may be taken in summer.

During the Victorian era in England this plant gained great recognition, often appearing in gardens and the herbaceous borders of parks. They were also grown as standards.  A vanilla-scented heliotrope was laid on the coffin of the American poet Emily Dickinson.

Cultivars
Its popularity may have become less in more modern times, but hardy and colourful cultivars, such as 'Princess Marina', have ensured that this plant still regularly appears in seed catalogues and garden centres.  Other popular cultivars include, 'Mary Fox', the highly scented 'White Lady' or 'White Queen' and the taller 'Florence Nightingale'.
'Fragrant delight' has more fragrant purple flowers, and leaves with purple highlights.
'Marine' has large highly fragrant dark purple flowerheads to 15 cm (6 in) diameter, and burgundy leaves.
'Sweet heaven' has paler fragrant flowers and is more heat-tolerant.
'White' has flowers that smell of almonds.

‘Chatsworth’ and 'Princess Marina' , both strongly scented with deep purple flowers, have gained the Royal Horticultural Society's Award of Garden Merit.

Toxicity
The seeds are poisonous. The ASPCA's Animal Poison Control Center article on heliotropes lists them as a substance which is toxic to horses and can induce liver failure in equines. The plant is not very palatable, but will be eaten by animals with no other forage; poisonings typically occur from ingestion of green plant material or material in hay. The toxic components can cause liver failure, referred to as "walking disease" or "sleepy staggers". Signs include weight loss, weakness, sleepiness, yawning, incoordination, yellowish discoloration to mucous membranes (icterus), neurologic problems secondary to liver failure (aimless walking, chewing motions, head pressing). Animals may appear to be normal at first, then become suddenly affected; the syndrome progresses rapidly over a few days to a week.

Pyrrolizidine alkaloids often cause upset stomachs and liver damage for humans who ingest any part of the plant.

The purple coloration of the flower lent itself to the so-called "heliotrope cyanosis" that was characteristic of severely ill patients in the 1918 flu pandemic.

Weed status in Australia
In the Australian states of South Australia and Victoria, common heliotrope is the most economically damaging of all of the invasive species in Australia, and its cost to the national economy (mainly borne by farmers) over the 60 years up to 2021 is estimated to be over half a billion Australian dollars.

Gallery

References

arborescens
Plants described in 1759
Taxa named by Carl Linnaeus